El-Fateh is an Egyptian city located near the city of Abnub in the Asyut Governorate.

References 

Populated places in Asyut Governorate